Judge John Ryon House, or Judge Ira Kilbourne House, is a historic home located at Lawrenceville in Tioga County, Pennsylvania. It is a two-story Greek Revival style house built in 1840.  It features a two-story portico with three full fluted Ionic columns and one somewhat less fluted column.

It was listed on the National Register of Historic Places in 1977.

See also 
 National Register of Historic Places listings in Tioga County, Pennsylvania

References 

Houses on the National Register of Historic Places in Pennsylvania
Houses completed in 1840
Houses in Tioga County, Pennsylvania
National Register of Historic Places in Tioga County, Pennsylvania